The Landrevinae are a subfamily of crickets, in the family Gryllidae (subfamily group Gryllinae), based on the type genus Landreva.  They are terrestrial, omnivorous and may be known as "bark crickets"; genera are distributed in: Central and South America, Africa, tropical Asia, Korea, Japan, Australia and the Pacific Islands.

Tribes and Genera
The Orthoptera Species File lists three tribes:

Landrevini
Auth. Gorochov, 1982

Ahldreva Otte, 1988
Ajorama Otte, 1988
Apiotarsoides Chopard, 1931
Avdrenia Otte, 1988
Copholandrevus Chopard, 1925
Drelanvus Chopard, 1930
Duolandrevus Kirby, 1906
Ectodrelanva Gorochov, 2000
Eleva (insect) Otte, 1988
Endodrelanva Gorochov, 2000
Endolandrevus Saussure, 1877
Fijina Otte, 1988
Ginidra Otte, 1988
Hemilandreva Chopard, 1936
Jareta Otte, 1988
Kotama Otte, 1988
Landreva Walker, 1869
Lasiogryllus Chopard, 1930
Mjobergella Chopard, 1925
Odontogryllodes Chopard, 1969
Otteana Gorochov, 1990
Papava Otte, 1988
Paralandrevus Saussure, 1877
Repapa Otte, 1988
Sigeva Otte, 1988
Solepa Otte, 1988
Sulawemina Gorochov, 2016
Vasilia Gorochov, 1988

Odontogryllini
Auth. de Mello, 1992
Brasilodontus de Mello, 1992
Odontogryllus Saussure, 1877
Valchica de Mello, 1992
Xulavuna de Mello & Campos, 2014
Yarrubura de Mello & Campos, 2014

Prolandrevini
Auth. Gorochov, 2005
Astriduleva Gorochov, 2016
Creolandreva Hugel, 2009
Gryllapterus Bolívar, 1912
Microlandreva Chopard, 1958
Oreolandreva Chopard, 1945
Prolandreva Gorochov, 2005
Striduleva Gorochov, 2016

References

External links

Crickets
Orthoptera subfamilies
Ensifera